The Rus'–Byzantine War of 941 took place during the reign of Igor of Kiev. The first naval attack was driven off and followed by another, successful offensive in 944. The outcome was the Rus'–Byzantine Treaty of 945.

The invasion 

The Rus' and their allies, the Pechenegs, disembarked on the northern coast of Asia Minor and swarmed over Bithynia in May 941. As usual, they seemed to have been well informed that the Imperial capital stood defenseless and vulnerable to attack: the Byzantine fleet had been engaged against the Arabs in the Mediterranean, while the bulk of the Imperial army had been stationed along the eastern borders.

Lecapenus arranged a defense of Constantinople by having 15 retired ships fitted out with throwers of Greek fire fore and aft. Igor, wishing to capture these Greek vessels and their crews but unaware of the fire-throwers, had his fleet surround them. Then, at an instant, the Greek-fire was hurled through tubes upon the Rus' and their allies; Liudprand of Cremona wrote: "The Rus', seeing the flames, jumped overboard, preferring water to fire. Some sank, weighed down by the weight of their breastplates and helmets; others caught fire." The captured Rus' were beheaded.

The Byzantines thus managed to dispel the Rus' fleet but not to prevent the pagans from pillaging the hinterland of Constantinople, venturing as far south as Nicomedia. Many atrocities were reported: the Russian Primary Chronicle said that the Rus’ used their victims for target practice or drove nails into their heads.  Several Byzantine historians (probably the Russian Primary Chronicle’s source for the information), provide additional details that the Rus’ crucified some of their captives and staked out others on the ground. 

In September, John Kourkouas and Bardas Phokas, two leading generals, speedily returned to the capital, anxious to repel the invaders. The Kievans promptly transferred their operations to Thrace, moving their fleet there. When they were about to retreat, laden with trophies, the Byzantine navy under Theophanes fell upon them.  Greek sources report that the Rus' lost their whole fleet in this surprise attack, so that only a handful of boats returned to their bases in the Crimea. The captured prisoners were taken to the capital and beheaded. Khazar sources add that the Rus' leader managed to escape to the Caspian Sea, where he met his death fighting the Arabs.

Aftermath
Igor was able to mount a new naval campaign against Constantinople as early as 944/945. Under threat from an even larger force than before, the Byzantines opted for diplomatic action to circumvent invasion. They offered tribute and trade privileges to the Rus'. The Byzantine offer was discussed between Igor and his generals after they reached the banks of the Danube, eventually accepting them. The Rus'–Byzantine Treaty of 945 was ratified as a result. This established friendly relations between the two sides.

Footnotes

References

Notes

Sources 

 

940s conflicts
941
Battles involving the Vikings
941
940s in the Byzantine Empire
Naval battles involving the Byzantine Empire
10th century in Kievan Rus'
Military history of the Black Sea
941